This is a list of all of the weapon products made by Heckler & Koch, a German weapons defence manufacturer with subsidiaries all over the world. It includes fully developed, experimental and military products, as well as those produced under license.

Civilian rifles

Grenade launchers

Machine guns

Pistols

Rifles

Shotguns

Sniper rifles

Submachine guns/machine pistols

Cartridges
HK 4.6×30mm

Other firearms

Flare devices
 EFL 
 P2A1

Ceremonial
 Heckler & Koch Saluting Gun M635

Underwater pistol
 HK P11

Prototypes

Pistols
 HK P46 (formerly UCP - Universal Combat Pistol)

Submachine guns
 SMG I & SMG II <
 HK MP5 PIP 
 MP2000

Rifles

 HK 32 (7.62×39 mm Prototype)
 HK 36 (4.6×36 mm Prototype)
 Heckler & Koch G11/Heckler & Koch ACR
 WSG2000
 Heckler & Koch was also a contractor for the XM29 and XM8 projects (both on hold as of 2005), as well as the related XM25.
 Heckler & Koch HK123 (5.62)

Shotguns
 HK CAWS

References

Lists of products
Technology-related lists